Zephyrhills South is a census-designated place (CDP) in Pasco County, Florida, United States. The population was 4,435 at the 2000 census.

Geography
Zephyrhills South is located at  (28.216394, -82.187413).

According to the United States Census Bureau, the CDP has a total area of 1.9 square miles (5.0 km), all land.

Climate

Demographics

At the 2000 census, there were 4,435 people, 2,199 households and 1,451 families residing in the CDP. The racial makeup was 96.05% White, 0.74% African American, 0.36% Native American, 0.36% Asian, 0.02% Pacific Islander, 0.59% from other races, and 1.87% from two or more races. Hispanic or Latino of any race were 2.64% of the population.

There were 2,199 households, of which 11.1% had children under the age of 18 living with them, 58.3% were married couples living together, 5.9% had a female householder with no husband present, and 34.0% were non-families. 28.4% of all households were made up of individuals, and 19.0% had someone living alone who was 65 years of age or older. The average household size was 2.02 and the average family size was 2.39.

11.7% of the population were under the age of 18, 3.9% from 18 to 24, 15.1% from 25 to 44, 22.3% from 45 to 64, and 47.0% who were 65 years of age or older. The median age was 63 years. For every 100 females, there were 93.4 males. For every 100 females age 18 and over, there were 92.2 males.

The median household income was $23,483 and the median family income was $29,681. Males had a median income of $26,771 and females $20,395 for. The per capita income was $14,905. About 8.1% of families and 12.5% of the population were below the poverty line, including 24.9% of those under age 18 and 7.2% of those age 65 or over.

References

Census-designated places in Pasco County, Florida
Census-designated places in Florida